Eliceo Aníbal Ramírez Vargas (27 September 1903 – 14 June 1962), known as Aníbal Ramírez, was a Chilean footballer.

Career
He was also part of Chile's squad for the 1924 South American Championship.

Personal life
He was the father of Jaime Ramírez, a Chile international forward who took part in the 1962 FIFA World Cup.

References

External links
 

1903 births
1962 deaths
Chilean footballers
Chile international footballers
Place of birth missing
Place of death missing
Association football goalkeepers